NOFX is the eponymous debut EP by the American punk rock band NOFX. Recorded at Mystic Studios in Hollywood, recorded and produced by Phillip (Philco) Raves. It was released on January 1, 1985 through Mystic Records. The first 500 copies included a lyrics sheet. The next 500 were pressed on light-blue vinyl, while the others were issued on black vinyl. The EP was included in its entirety on Maximum Rocknroll.

The song "Six Pack Girls" made it onto the VHS release Ten Years of Fuckin' Up. It played over a montage of early pictures of the band.

Track listing 
 "Live Your Life" (2:20)
 "My Friends" (2:17)
 "Six Pack Girls" (0:35)
 "Bang Gang" (1:30)
 "Hit It" (1:53)
 "Hold It Back" (1:14)
 "I.D." (2:00)

References 

1985 EPs
NOFX EPs